Cora comaltepeca is a species of basidiolichen in the family Hygrophoraceae. Found in southern Mexico, it was formally described as a new species in 2016 by Bibiana Moncada, Rosa Emilia Pérez, and Robert Lücking. The specific epithet comaltepeca refers to the type locality in Santiago Comaltepec (Oaxaca), where it grows as an epiphyte on tree branches in tropical-temperate cloud forests.

References

comaltepeca
Lichen species
Lichens described in 2016
Lichens of Mexico
Taxa named by Robert Lücking
Basidiolichens